Gindari 2: Bahubuthayo 3 ( 3) is a 2022 Sinhalese comedy mystery film written and directed and produced by Udayakantha Warnasuriya. The film served as a sequel to the 2015 film Gindari, which is the third installment of Bahubuthayo film series. Rodney Warnakula, Mahendra Perera and Paboda Sandeepani in reprise their lead roles along with Saman Hemaratne and Srinath Maddumage. Music composed by Ananda Perera.

Production
The filming starts in January 2019. Scenes in the film were shot in and around the towns of Colombo, Sri Lanka for 45 days.

Plot

Cast
 Paboda Sandeepani as Tikiri 
 Mahendra Perera as Lanti
 Rodney Warnakula as Bunty
 Tishen Wanhof as Supiri
 Richerd Manamudali as Chaminda
 Srinath Maddumage
 Sarath Kothalawala
 Chulakshi Ranathunga
 Sarath Chandrasiri
 Teena Shanel
 Saman Hemaratne
 Ananda Atukorale
 Chanchala Warnasuriya
 Nilmini Kottegoda
 Chathura Perera
 Vasantha Vittachchi

International screening
The special screening of the film was held during "The Scope Film Festival" which was held daily from the 4th to the 8th of September 2020 at the Liberty Cinema Hall, Colombo at 10.30, 2.30 and 7.00 screenings. On 20 December 2020, the film's first international premiere will take place at 7pm at Mill Park and Narre Warren in Melbourne, Australia. All tickets for these seasons were distributed online and are now sold out.

The movie was screened on the 13 February 2021 at 4.30 pm at the Cinema Village Hobbit in Tasmania. This was the first time that a Sri Lankan film was screened in Tasmania.

References

Sinhala-language films
Sri Lankan comedy films
Sri Lankan sequel films
Films directed by Udayakantha Warnasuriya